Mario Miradji (born 20 June 1984) is a retired Malagasy football midfielder.

References

1984 births
Living people
Malagasy footballers
Madagascar international footballers
Ecoredipharm players
Association football midfielders